The Church of the Parigoritissa or Paregoretissa is the 13th-century Byzantine metropolitan church of the Greek city of Arta. Part of the building used to house the Archaeological Collection of Arta.

The church was founded in ca. 1290 by the Despot of Epirus, Nikephoros I Komnenos Doukas (r. 1268–1297), and his second wife Anna Kantakouzene.  The church eventually became bankrupt, and was turned into a dependency (metochion) of the Monastery of Kato Panagia. In 1578, it is attested as a female convent.

The church is a large, almost square three-storey building. It is of the octagonal type, with the central dome supported by eight piers divided into three tiers. There are also four smaller domes on each corner of the church's flat roof, and a lantern. Its interior decoration is rich, with marble revetment up to the level of the galleries, and extensive surviving mosaics and frescoes above that. On the dome the mosaic of the Pantokrator, surrounded by angels, and 12 prophets between the drum's windows. These mosaics were probably executed by artists from outside Epirus. 16th-century frescoes by the painter Ananias survive in the altar, while 17th-century frescoes decorate the main church. The church's decoration also displays a number of Western influences in its statuary, such as Romanesque monsters and reliefs depicting Biblical scenes.

See also
History of Roman and Byzantine domes

References

External links
Church of Panaghia “Parigoritissa” (discoverarta)

Churches completed in 1290
13th-century Eastern Orthodox church buildings
Buildings and structures in Arta, Greece
Despotate of Epirus
Byzantine church buildings in Epirus (region)
Eastern Orthodox church buildings in Greece
13th-century churches in Greece
Church buildings with domes